Marion Township is one of the seventeen townships of Hancock County, Ohio, United States. As of the 2010 census, the population was 2,759, up from 2,203 people at the 2000 census.

Geography
Located in the central part of the county, it borders the following municipalities:
Cass Township - north
Washington Township - northeast corner
Biglick Township - east
Amanda Township - southeast
Jackson Township - south
Eagle Township - southwest corner
City of Findlay - west (the county seat)
Allen Township - northwest

Name and history
It is one of twelve Marion Townships statewide.

Marion Township was organized in 1833. The township was probably named for Francis Marion, a general in the American Revolutionary War who was also known as the Swamp Fox.

Government
The township is governed by a three-member board of trustees, who are elected in November of odd-numbered years to a four-year term beginning on the following January 1. Two are elected in the year after the presidential election and one is elected in the year before it. There is also an elected township fiscal officer, who serves a four-year term beginning on April 1 of the year after the election, which is held in November of the year before the presidential election. Vacancies in the fiscal officership or on the board of trustees are filled by the remaining trustees.

References

External links

Townships in Hancock County, Ohio
Townships in Ohio